Psychomania Records was a record label based in Scotland. They specialized in a brand of noise-infused grindcore, that has become synonymous with the label itself. The label put out releases from The Gerogerigegege, Cripple Bastards, Extreme Smoke, Anal Cunt, Scrawl, Patareni, Crucifix, Seven Minutes Of Nausea, Meat Shits, Seduce and others.

See also
 List of record labels

External links
Psychomania Records discography @ Discogs.com

Scottish record labels
Record labels established in 1984
Noise music record labels